Jesse J. Goldburg (1881 – 1959) was an American film producer active during the silent era. He managed the low-budget company Independent Pictures based on a studio on Sunset Boulevard.

Selected filmography

 Life Without Soul (1915)
 The Curious Conduct of Judge Legarde (1915)
 The Profiteer (1919)
 A Desperate Adventure (1924)
 Flashing Spurs (1924)
 Dangerous Pleasure (1924)
 Trigger Fingers (1924)
 Galloping Vengeance (1925)
 The Texas Bearcat (1925)
 The Bloodhound (1925)
 Dangerous Odds (1925)
 Barriers of the Law (1925)
 That Man Jack! (1925)
 Border Intrigue (1925)
 Blood and Steel (1925)
 Duped (1925)
 Riders of Mystery (1925)
 The Ridin' Streak (1925)
 Accused (1925)
 Billy the Kid (1925)
 The Gambling Fool (1925)
 Outwitted (1925)
 Beyond the Rockies (1926)
 Sunshine of Paradise Alley (1926)
 The Dead Line (1926)
 The Dude Cowboy (1926)
 Hair-Trigger Baxter (1926)
 The Valley of Bravery (1926)
 Bulldog Pluck (1927)
 The Fighting Hombre (1927)
 Life of an Actress (1927)
 Driven from Home (1927)
 No Man's Law (1927)

References

Bibliography
 Stephens, E.J. & Wanamaker, Marc. Early Poverty Row Studios. Arcadia Publishing, 2014.
 Slide, Anthony. The New Historical Dictionary of the American Film Industry. Routledge, 2014.

External links

1881 births
1959 deaths
American screenwriters
American film producers
People from New York City